"The One" is a song by recording artist A-Lee from his second studio album, Forever Lost (2012). It was released on January 11, 2011, in Norway, on EE Records and Columbia/Sony Music Norway. A-Lee worked with producers Ground Rules.

"The One" is A-Lee's second single and it sold 2× Platinum in Norway and reached #7 at Norwegian Single Charts VG-Lista. It was also certified the most-played song on all Norwegian radio in 2011.It was also the most played song on radio NRK mP3 in 2011 making A-Lee being #1 on this radio for the second consecutive year after 2010 and ranked #2 at the NRJ radio Norway best song of 2011. The song "The One" was also nominated for Best Norwegian Hit at NRJ Music Awards 2012.

In 2011, A-Lee performed "The One" at huge annual show VG-Lista Rådhusplassen in Oslo where he attended for the second consecutive year after 2010.

Track listing

Personnel
 Björn Engelmann – mastering
 Shahrouz Ghafourian – executive producer, management
 Bjarte Giske – producer, engineer, mixer
 Morten Pape – producer, engineer, mixer, vocals
 Raphaël Piguet – photography
 Ali Pirzad-Amoli – vocals, executive producer, artwork design

Chart positions and certifications

Release history

References

External links
 A-Lee Official Site

2011 singles